Sallie Aley Hert (1863 – 1948) was vice chairman of the Republican National Committee from 1924 to 1936. She was the state chairwoman of the Republican women of Kentucky. She headed the national Republican National Committee women's organization.

Biography
She was born in 1863 as Sallie Aley. She married Alvin Tobias Hert (1865–1921) on November 20, 1893. She was vice chairman of the Republican National Committee from 1924 to 1936. She died in 1948. She was buried at Cave Hill Cemetery in Louisville, Kentucky.

External links
Sallie Aley Hert at Republican National Convention, 1932 at University of Louisville
Sallie Aley Hert, 1928 at University of Louisville

References

1863 births
1948 deaths
Kentucky Republicans
Burials at Cave Hill Cemetery